Arctic, Antarctic, and Alpine Research is a peer-reviewed scientific journal published by the Institute of Arctic and Alpine Research (University of Colorado Boulder). It covers research on all aspects of Arctic, Antarctic, and alpine environments, including subarctic, subantarctic, subalpine, and paleoenvironments. Jack D. Ives founded the journal in 1969   as Arctic and Alpine Research and the name was expanded to include the Antarctic in 1999. The editors-in-chief are Anne E. Jennings and Bill Bowman (University of Colorado Boulder).

Abstracting and indexing 
The journal is abstracted and indexed in the Science Citation Index, Current Contents/Agriculture, Biology & Environmental Sciences, The Zoological Record, and BIOSIS Previews. According to the Journal Citation Reports, the journal has a 2017 impact factor of 2.231.

References

External links 
 

Earth and atmospheric sciences journals
Environmental science journals
Publications established in 1969
Arctic research
Quarterly journals
University of Colorado Boulder
English-language journals
Antarctic research